The collections of the Pinacoteca Comunale di Cesena, in Cesena, Italy, contain works by:

Antonio Aleotti (Argenta, doc. from 1494 – Cesena, 1527) 
Francesco Andreini (painter) (Cesena, 1697–1751)
Allegory of Charity
Portrait of Cardinal Francesco Locatelli
Vincenzo Baldacci (Cesena, known from 1802 to 1813) 
Giovanni Francesco Barbieri, (Guercino) (Cento, 1591 – Bologna, 1666) 
St Francis receives stigmata
Giovanni Battista Bertucci the younger (Faenza, 1539–1614) 
Giacomo Francesco Cipper, known as Todeschini (Feldkirch, 1664 – Milan, 1736) 
Vittorio Matteo Corcos, (1859, Livourne -1933, Florence)
Antonio Cardile, (Taranto, 1914 – Roma, 1986) 
Bartolomeo Coda (son of Benedetto Coda (Rimini, doc. from 1516 to 1563) 
Girolamo Forabosco (Venice, 1605 – Padua, 1679)
Either Suicide by Sophonisba or Artemisia drinks the ashes of her husband Mausolo
Bartolomeo Gennari (Cento, 1594 – Bologna, 1661) 
Costantino Guidi (Cesena, 1832–1899) 
Renato Guttuso (Bagheria, 1911 – Roma, 1987)
Eberhart Keilhau, known as Monsù Bernardo (Helsingør, 1624 – Rome, 1687) 
Francesco Longhi (Ravenna, 1554–1618) 
Girolamo Marchesi da Cotignola (Cotignola, c. 1490 – Bologna, c. 1559) 
Giuseppe Milani (Fontanellato, c. 1716 – Cesena, 1798) 
Bartolomeo Passerotti (Bologna, 1529–1592) 
Portrait of young musician
Enea Peroni (Cesena, 1810 c. – doc. to 1844) 
Giovanni Battista Piazzetta (Venice, 1683–1754)
Sacrifice of Iphigenia 
Antonio Pio (Cesena, 1809 – London, 1871) 
Agostino Plachesi (Cesena, c. 1725–1805) 
Francesco Raibolini, known as Francia (Bologna, 1450 c. – 1517)
Madonna and child - Presentation at temple 
Giovanni Battista Razzani (Cesena, 1603–1666) 
Gasparo Sacchi (Imola, active c. 1517–1536) 
Scipione Sacco (Sogliano sul Rubicone, 1495 – Cesena, 1558) 
Giovanni Battista Salvi, (Sassoferrato, 1609 – Rome, 1685)
Archangel Gabriel & Virgin receiving annunciation
Madonna and child
Sorrowful Virgin
Praying Virgin
Cristoforo Serra (Cesena, 1600–1689)

Sources
Home page
Also see excellent collection at the Galleria dei dipinti antichi della Fondazione Cassa di Risparmio di Cesena (Gallery of Antique paintings of the Foundation of Cesena Saving Bank)

External links

Art museums and galleries in Emilia-Romagna
Cesena
Collections of museums in Italy
Museums in Emilia-Romagna